Prathap or Pratap is a name used in India as a man's given name, or as a surname.
Prathap means daring

Notable people
Prathap (Kannada actor), an Indian film actor
Maharana Pratap Singh (1540–1597) - an Indian Rajput ruler of Mewar
Sai Prathap Annayyagari (b. 1944) - Indian National Congress politician
Vidhu Prathap (b. 1980) - Indian singer

Media
 Prathap (film), a Tamil-language film directed by Arjun

Other
Pho Prathap Chang District - district in Phichit province, Thailand
Prathapa Mudaliar Charithram - 1879 Tamil novel by M. V. Pillai
Veera Prathap - Telugu-language title of the Tamil film Uthama Puthiran (1958 film)